First Album, The First Album, or 1st Album may refer to:

The 1st Album (Modern Talking album), 1985
First Album (Miss Kittin & The Hacker album), 2001
First Album (The International Playboys album), 2002
1st Album (5566 album), 2002
First Album (Twelve album), 2003
The First Album (183 Club album), 2006
First Album (Tofubeats album), 2014
The Fugs First Album, a 1965 album by the Fugs
ZZ Top's First Album, a 1970 album by ZZ Top
James Taylor (album), a 1968 album by James Taylor; released in South Africa as First Album
Wild Horses (Wild Horses album), 1980; later reissued as The First Album
Madonna (Madonna album), 1983; later reissued as Madonna: The First Album
First Album, a 1992 album by Dive

See also
Debut (disambiguation)

All Wikipedia articles about debut albums